Radio KLF was a radio station based in Helsinki, broadcasting on FM on the frequencies 100.0 MHz (Helsinki), 101.9 MHz (Turku), 101.6 MHz (Tampere) and 98.1 MHz Oulu. It mainly played dance music.

External links
Official website 

Radio stations in Finland
Dance radio stations
Mass media in Helsinki

Radio stations established in 2005 
Radio stations disestablished in 2011 
Defunct radio stations 
Defunct mass media in Finland